Mount Saint Joseph Academy may refer to:

 Mount St. Joseph Academy (West Hartford, Connecticut)
 Saint Joseph Preparatory High School, Boston, Massachusetts, formerly the Mount Saint Joseph Academy
 Mount Saint Joseph Academy (Buffalo, New York), now closed
 Mount Saint Joseph Academy (Flourtown, Pennsylvania), an all-female Catholic college
 Mount Saint Joseph Academy (Rutland, Vermont)